Orange Polska (formerly Telekomunikacja Polska) is a Polish telecommunications provider established in December 1991. It is a public company traded on the Warsaw Stock Exchange, with a controlling stake owned by Orange S.A., the latter controlling over 50% of this stake by 2002. It operates the following services: PSTN, ISDN, GSM 900/1800 network, ADSL, IDSL, Frame Relay, ATM and Inmarsat.

History
Telekomunikacja Polska was established in December 1991 as a joint stock company under the control of the State Treasury, following the split-up of the communist era state-owned PTT entity Polish Post, Telegraph and Telephone (pl:Polska Poczta, Telegraf i Telefon). On 1 January 1992, the company began operations under the name of 'TPSA'. The company changed its ownership structure in 1998 and began trading on the Warsaw Stock Exchange in 2000. In the same year, the Treasury sold a 35% stake in TPSA to a consortium of France Télécom and Kulczyk Holding, with the consortium increasing its stake by a further 12.5% in 2001.

On 21 December 2007, company was fined PLN 75 million (approximately EUR 20.7 million) by the Polish Office for Competition and Consumer Protection (pl: Urząd Ochrony Konkurencji i Konsumentów) for discriminating against its competitors on the internet services market.

Full privatisation of the company was completed in May 2010.

In 2010 the company reported that they had almost 500,000 pay TV subscribers, with the number now being 695,000 (as of late 2012). The company currently serves approximately 5.6 million broadband customers.

In 2011 TPSA had a $430 million claim filed against them by GN Store Nord (GN), which owns 75% of DPTG, in the second phase of an arbitration trial. Bloomberg reported that, "DPTG won a 2.2 billion-krone award in September at an arbitration tribunal in Vienna. The tribunal said the company had improperly calculated what it owed DPTG for a fiber-optic transmission system the venture installed in 1991. "TPSA" owed payments based on data traffic over the network. The companies disagreed over how to measure the traffic and spent nine years in arbitration. The September award covered traffic from 1994 to 2004, and the new claim refers to 2004 to 2009. TPSA has not paid the first award and has filed a complaint about the arbitration, while GN has started enforcement proceedings in Poland and the Netherlands."

On 16 April 2012, Telekomunikacja Polska was renamed as Orange Polska, in line with France Télécom's international telecommunications branding.

Internet service
Orange Polska's ADSL service in Poland is called Neostrada. The service is widely available throughout the country and is one of the most heavily subscribed to in Poland.

Mobile network

Orange Polska mobile was founded in December 1991 to operate an analogue (first-generation) network under the Centertel brand. It launched Idea, Poland's third GSM network, in 1998, operating on both the 900 and 1800-MHz bands from the beginning. Until 2001, when the analogue network was switched off, Idea was known as Idea Centertel, and former analogue customers were offered GSM contracts. Idea's slogan was Łączy Cię z ludźmi ("Connects you with people").

Idea adopted the Orange brand name in 2005, although the operating company was still formally known as PTK Centertel until 31 December 2013. It, along with parent company Orange Polska S.A., is controlled by Orange S.A. The brand change took place simultaneously on 19 September 2005. The company sponsored a free concert in Warsaw by British musician Sting on 24 September 2005 for 150,000 of its clients to publicise the changeover.

The company also operates WLAN, 3G UMTS, 4G LTE and 5G NR networks in Poland. As of late 2011, the network had 14.7 million subscribers.

In March 2013, Orange Poland (OPL) officially launched mobile access to the Internet using IPv6 protocol for its subscribers. Solution is based on IPv6-only APN with CLAT/NAT64/DNS. Implementation of the 464xlat architecture.  is mandatory on device - CPE

References

External links
 

Orange S.A.
Mobile phone companies of Poland
Telecommunications companies of Poland
Telecommunications companies established in 1991
Companies based in Warsaw
Companies listed on the Warsaw Stock Exchange
1991 establishments in Poland